Kuruppampady is situated about five kilometers from Perumbavoor on the Aluva-Munnar road, in Kunnathunad Taluk, Ernakulam district, Kerala, India.

Location

It is surrounded by important places viz. Perumbavoor, Kalady, Malayattoor, Angamaly, Aluva, Muvattupuzha, Odakkaly, Kallil, Iringole kavu (miniature forest), Kolencherry, Kottapady, Kothamangalam, Alattuchira, Vengoor, Kombanad, Panamkuzhy, Poru, Vengola, Paniyely, Kodanad, Kurichilakode and so on and so forth within 20 kilometers' radius. Kuruppampady is also famous for its lemon grass production for about a century.

The Name kuruppampady came from kurupide padi (kurupe was a great ayurvedic doctor at that time) ,  The village is known for the ancient St. Marys Jacobite Syrian Cathedral, more commonly known as Kuruppampady Palli. It also has two temples: Iricvichira siva temple and Kootumadhom temple.

Kerala Vyapari Vyavasayi Ekopana Samithi office, Kuruppampady private bus stand, Court, District institutional training centre for teachers DIET Ernakulam, Krishna hospital, Hotel Hamilton International, Koovapady block office, Mini industrial village, Tech steel industries, Bank of India, Federal bank, South Indian Bank, Dhanalaxmi bank, State Bank of India etc., are the important landmarks in town.

References 

Villages in Ernakulam district